The Middlesex Filter Beds Weir, or Lea Bridge Road Weir, marks the start of the Hackney Cut, an artificial channel of the River Lee Navigation built in 1770, in the London Borough of Hackney. The weir lies between the former Middlesex Filter Beds – now a nature reserve – and the Thames Water treatment works at Lea Bridge Road.

Excess water from the Navigation passes over the weir into the former natural channel of the River Lee that passes in a large loop to the east of the modern water course, as the Old River Lea. The natural water course travels  and rejoins the Navigation below Old Ford Lock.

External links
Middlesex Filter Beds on the Official Lee Valley website

Weirs on the River Lea
Buildings and structures in the London Borough of Hackney
Geography of the London Borough of Hackney